Arts & Business is a charitable organisation whose role is to develop partnerships between the cultural and private sectors in the United Kingdom. Their aim is to increase investment for the arts from businesses and individuals, while encouraging the exchange of business and creative skills in both sectors. They go about this mission through programming in philanthropy, research, sponsorship, training, and consultancy.

History
Founded in 1976 as Association for Business Sponsorship of the Arts (ABSA), Arts & Business was based on a model developed in New York by David Rockefeller. The first organisation of its kind in the UK, ABSA pioneered business sponsorship of the arts in the UK.

Philanthropy
The Prince of Wales Medal for Arts Philanthropy was created in 2008 to honour leading philanthropists who have made an outstanding contribution to cultural organisations in the UK. Five individuals or couples are honoured each year for the impact of their financial donations, leadership and support has had on a regional or national level. The honourees are presented their medal by The Prince of Wales at a ceremony at his private residence in November. Previous honourees include Lord and Lady Sainsbury and Dame Vivien Louise Clore Duffield, DBE.

The Big Arts Give is a challenge fund scheme to help arts organisations develop income from individual giving. This scheme, devised with The Reed Foundation and The Big Give aims to raise £3 million donated to the arts by Christmas 2010.

Cultural Champions is a programme designed to promote personal philanthropy in the cultural sector. It acknowledges individuals who have made a voluntary contribution to the arts in England.

The Arts & Business Awards 
The annual Arts & Business Awards showcase partnerships and sponsorships between businesses and arts organisations in the UK. Categories include cultural branding, people development, community and young people, sustained partnerships, and business innovation as well as awards for individuals who sit on arts boards or act as arts fundraisers.

Research
Private Investment in Culture Survey or PICS is the largest single project they undertake and has been conducted in one form or another for 30 years. It is the world’s most comprehensive survey of investment trends from businesses, individuals and Trusts & Foundations. The findings tend to generate news coverage from the national press such as The Telegraph   to trade press such as Arts Industry 

Some of their other work includes research produced by James Gilmore and Joseph Pine on branding and the arts. This research was published under the title Beyond Experience.

Digital technologies are also currently being researched by Arts & Business with a focus on experimentation in digital marketing, new business models, fundraising and income generation.

References

External links
Arts & Business Official Website
Arts & Business on Twitter
Arts & Business Facebook page

Charities based in London
Arts organisations based in the United Kingdom